Namibicola is a genus of snout moths described by Boris Balinsky in 1991.

Species
 Namibicola barrettae (Hampson, 1901)
 Namibicola karios Mey, 2011
 Namibicola palmwagos Mey, 2011
 Namibicola simplex Balinsky, 1994
 Namibicola splendida Balinsky, 1991

References

Phycitinae